John Filion (born 1950) is a former Toronto city councillor represented Ward 18 Willowdale. Although he had planned to retire in 2018, after the legislation from Premier Doug Ford which expanded ward boundaries, he decided to run for re-election because he believes it makes it "virtually impossible for a community activist, known within one area, to get elected". He announced on June 10, 2022, that he would not be running in the October 2022 Toronto municipal election, retiring after 40 years in municipal politics. He was considered a "rare suburban progressive" on Toronto council.

Education
Filion attended York University and he graduated with a degree in history. He became a journalist specializing in education issues. He was the founding editor of the Canadian World Almanac.

Early political career
He first entered politics as a trustee on the North York Board of Education to which he was elected in 1981. From 1987 to 1990 he served as chair of the school board. He was elected to North York's city council in 1990 replacing retiring councillor Jim McGuffin. He moved to Toronto city council with the creation of the new city in 1997. He received a great deal of attention for his role as chair of the city's Board of Health. He used this position to push for a smoking ban in Toronto bars and restaurants and to force restaurants to post records of their health inspections. As a member of the police services board he was a sharp critic of chief Julian Fantino and also publicly accused members of the police force of monitoring his activities.

Mayor Rob Ford stripped of powers
In 2013, after admissions by Mayor Rob Ford that he had purchased and smoked crack cocaine while in office, made homophobic and racist remarks and possibly drove while intoxicated, Filion put forward an emergency motion which transferred much of the mayor's budget and emergency powers to the Deputy Mayor. A further motion put forward by  Filion also removed his ability to set key matters on the legislative agenda, and removed his right to fill vacancies on the civic appointments committee.

Chair of Toronto Board of Health
Filion as chair of the Toronto Board of Health created the DineSafe eatery inspection and notification system which rose compliance with food safety regulations in Toronto restaurants from 42% to 90% and reduced cases of food-borne illnesses in Toronto by 30% in its first 8 years. He also championed the restaurant smoking ban.

Toronto Parking Authority land purchase
Executives from the Toronto Parking Authority and Giorgio Mammoliti pushed for a deal that would have had the city overpay by approximately $2.6 million for a piece of land in Mammoliti's ward, according to a report to Toronto City Council by law firm Torys LLP. The deal was days from being completed when it fell through largely due to pressure from Filion.  Filion repeatedly questioned the cost of the purchase. He also accused Toronto Parking Authority executives of withholding information. According to the report Filion told the TPA's vice president of real estate, Maria Casista, "I'm calling the cops". Toronto's auditor general and the Ontario Provincial Police are currently (2018) investigating the land deal.

A La Cart
Filion spearheaded Toronto's A La Cart program, an attempt to introduce variety into Toronto's street food scene. The program was terminated two years into its three-year pilot program. Some participants in the program complained they were left bankrupt from the experience. Meddling city bureaucracy and expensive, city-specified food carts that malfunctioned were some of the reasons cited for the failure of Filion's program. Councillor Filion wouldn't apologize for the failure but did admit to it being a humbling experience. He suggested he would do it differently if given the chance.

Target of violence
Early on April 4, 2019, bullets were fired into Filion's car and home, several weeks after an armed man attempted to force his way into Filion's home. Filion stated, "I suspect I have been targeted and that this is related to my work as a city councillor."

Personal life
He is the partner of Canadian Broadcasting Corporation journalist Anna Maria Tremonti.

Election results (Toronto City Council)

Unofficial results as of October 26, 2010 03:55 am

References

External links

1950 births
Journalists from Montreal
Journalists from Toronto
Living people
Toronto city councillors
York University alumni
Politicians from Montreal